American composer and pianist Betty Rose Wishart was born on September 22, 1947, in Lumberton, North Carolina. She earned music degrees from Queens College (Charlotte, North Carolina) and the University of North Carolina at Chapel Hill, then pursued further studies in New York City. Her major teachers were Roger Hannay, Richard Bunger Evans, Donald Waxman, Michael Zenge, and Wolfgang Rose.

Wishart taught piano, theory, and composition at Kohinoor Music Company from 1972 to 1973, and joined the staff of Argo Classical Records in 1973. She started composing in 1974, initially under the name B. R. Wishart to disguise her gender. She served as president of the Southeastern Composers' League in 2008.

Wishart has received awards from:
American College of Musicians
American Pen Women
American Society of Composers, Authors, and Publishers (ASCAP)
Broward County Music Teachers Association
Composers Guild
Delta Omicron
Fayetteville/Cumberland County Arts Council
Vox Novus

Her compositions include:

Chamber 

Ch'ien (four violins, temple blocks)
Dreams (clarinet and piano; 1983)
Experience (string quintet; 1971)
Memories of Things Unseen (violin, flute, clarinet, cello; 1973)
Memories II (violin, flute, clarinet, cello; 1983)
Oracles (flute and piano)

Organ 

Meditations for Trinity (1976)
Prelude (1975)
Sounds (1972)

Piano 

Apprehensions (1971)
Illusion Suite(1968)
Kohinoor Sonata (1971)
Leukoplakia (1968)
Night Visions Suite
Reflections (1983)
Remembrance
Reverie (1983)
Salute (1982)
Sonata
Sonata No. 2
Toccata II
Toccata III
Variations on a Folk Melody

Vocal 

Go Now in Peace (soprano and alto; 1982)
Hymn for the Children (1979)
Lullabies for Peace
Melancholy (1968)
Shanti
Requiem for Dreams

Discography 

Piano Sonorities – Ravello Records 2016
Concertante No. 1 Journey into the Unknown –Navona Records 2017

References 

American women classical composers
American classical composers
American composers
1947 births
Living people
21st-century American women
University of North Carolina alumni
ASCAP